Events from the year 2022 in Saint Lucia

Incumbents 

 Monarch: Elizabeth II (until September 8); then Charles III 
 Governor-General: Errol Charles
 Prime Minister: Philip J. Pierre

Events 
Ongoing — COVID-19 pandemic in Saint Lucia

 1 July – Saint Lucia reports its first case of monkeypox.
 8 September – Accession of Charles III as King of Saint Lucia following the death of Queen Elizabeth II.
 19 September – Saint Lucians across the country are invited to pause for a 70-second national tribute to reflect on the life and legacy of Elizabeth II, Queen of Saint Lucia. Church bells and sirens from fire stations throughout the nation sounded for one minute and 10 seconds starting at 09:59 to herald the commencement of the 70-second reflection period at 10:00.
 19 September – Acting Governor-General Errol Charles, Deputy Prime Minister Ernest Hilaire and High Commissioner Anthony Severin attend the state funeral of Queen Elizabeth II in the United Kingdom.

Deaths 

 10 April – Desmond Brathwaite, politician, MP (1987–1997).
 8 September – Elizabeth II, Queen of Saint Lucia since 1979 (b. 1926).

References 

 
Years of the 21st century in Saint Lucia
Saint Lucia
Saint Lucia
2020s in Saint Lucia